Baginski or Bagiński (feminine: Bagińska; plural: Bagińscy) is a surname of Slavic-language origin. It appears in multiple languages in various forms. Belarusian and Ukrainian surnames are generally transliterated with an 'h' but may also use a 'g'.

Related surnames

People

Baginski 
 Jan Bagiński (1932–2019), Polish Roman Catholic bishop
 Jacquelyn Baginski (born 1985/1986), American politician
 Jonathan Baginski, Australian filmmaker and futurist
 Leo Maximilian Baginski (1881–1964), German entrepreneur and inventor
 Maureen Baginski, American government official
 Max Baginski (1864–1943), German-American anarchist
 Mieczysław Bagiński (born 1944), Polish politician
 Tomasz Bagiński (born 1976), Polish artist

Baginsky 
 Adolf Aron Baginsky (1843–1918), German pediatrician
 Benno Baginsky (1848–1919), German otorhinolaryngologist

See also
 
 

Polish-language surnames
Jewish surnames
Polish toponymic surnames